The 2022 Men's South American Cricket Championship was a cricket tournament that took place in Itaguaí, Brazil from 20 to 23 October 2022. This was the seventeenth edition of the men's South American Cricket Championship, and the second in which matches were eligible for T20I status, since the ICC granted Twenty20 International (T20I) status to matches between all of its members. However, matches played in this edition did not have T20I status.

The seven participating teams were the national sides of hosts Brazil, along with Argentina, Chile, Colombia, Mexico, Peru and Uruguay. Argentina were the defending champions having won the event in 2019.

Before the men's tournament, the Women's South American Championship, as well tournaments for under-15s and under-19s were played in October 2022.

Squads

Round-robin

Points table

 Advanced to the final

Day one

Day two

Day three

Day four

Final

See also
 2022 Women's South American Cricket Championship

References

External links
 Series home at CricClubs

Associate international cricket competitions in 2022–23
Men's South American Cricket Championship
South American Cricket Championship